Ruzaneh (also Romanized as Rūzaneh and Rowzaneh; also known as Ruzīneh) is a village in Mosharrahat Rural District, in the Central District of Ahvaz County, Khuzestan Province, Iran. At the 2006 census, its population was 104, in 22 families.

References 

Populated places in Ahvaz County